Osmaniye is a town in Alpu district of Eskişehir Province, Turkey. At  it is situated in the plains of Central Anatolia. The population of Osmaniye was 1102. The settlement was founded by Pomak people from Lovech and Plovdiv (now in Bulgaria)  after the Russo-Turkish War (1877-1878). In 1992, Osmaniye  was declared a seat of township .

References

External links
Images

Populated places in Eskişehir Province
Towns in Turkey
Alpu District